The Florida Mountains are a small  long, mountain range in New Mexico.

The Florida Mountains are east and adjacent to New Mexico State Road 11, the north–south route to Chihuahua; it becomes Highway 23 in Chihuahua and connects to Mexican Federal Highway 2, the major east–west route of the north Chihuahuan Desert adjacent the U.S.-Mexico border.

Description
The range highpoint is Florida Peak, which lies near the north. Other high peaks in the center-south, are Gym, Baldy, and South Peak.

Most of the land surrounding the prominent rise of the mountain range are flatlands. Deming, and its suburbs directly south, form the northwest and west border of the range's minor foothills. Populated flatlands are northeast, with open flatlands to the east and southeast.

New Mexico 198 lies at the range's north, the location of Rockhound State Park.

Environment and ecology
Persian (Bezoar) Ibex (Capra aegagrus aegagrus) have been introduced into the region, and have an established population.

See also
 List of peaks named Baldy
 Battle of the Florida Mountains

References

External links
Peaks
Florida Peak, trails.com

Landforms of Luna County, New Mexico
Mountain ranges of New Mexico